Ras-related protein Rab-6B is a protein that in humans is encoded by the RAB6B gene.

References

Further reading